Fangaua is an islet of Nukulaelae Atoll, Tuvalu on which is Pepesala, the main village of Nukulaelae, with a population of 347 people (2012 census).

References

Populated places in Tuvalu
Nukulaelae